John Haggerty (born October 17, 1960, Chicago) is an influential Chicago guitarist. A key member of Naked Raygun during their heyday (1983–1989), Haggerty formed the band Pegboy, with brother Joe Haggerty on drums and Steve Saylors (bass) and Larry Damore (vocals) of the Bhopal Stiffs, upon leaving Naked Raygun.

Background
The eldest son of a plumber father and a librarian mother, Haggerty first picked up the guitar at age 16. His early influences included Jimmy Page, Ritchie Blackmore, Michael Schenker and Brian Robertson. Upon discovering the Chicago punk scene at O'Banions, Haggerty quickly began searching for his place in punk rock. His biggest influences were the Buzzcocks, the Ramones, Stiff Little Fingers and the Jam.

John also plays in a band called the Nefarious Fat Cats which features an all star line up including himself and brother Joe, Jake Burns of Stiff Little Fingers, Herb Rosen of Beer Nuts and Rights of the Accused, Mark DeRosa of the band Dummy and Scott Lucas of Local H.

John toured with Stiff Little Fingers in mid-2011 as a substitute for Ian McCallum, who could not make the tour due to illness.

In 2021 Haggerty became a member of industrial/punk/hard rock supergroup The Joy Thieves by contributing a guitar track to their song "Nihilist Landscape" from their album, "American Parasite."

Partial discography

Naked Raygun
Throb Throb (1983)
All Rise (1986)
Jettison (1988)
Understand? (1989)
Last Of The Demo Hicans (1997)

Pegboy
Strong Reaction (1991)
Earwig (1994)
Cha Cha Damore (1997)

References

American rock guitarists
American male guitarists
1960 births
Living people
Guitarists from Chicago
20th-century American guitarists
Naked Raygun members
Pegboy members
Stiff Little Fingers members
20th-century American male musicians